Central Academy is a chain of schools founded by the late Shri Triyugi Narayan Mishra, an educationist, social activist, and philanthropist.

The first branch of Central Academy was established in Jaipur, (also known as the mother branch) in the state of Rajasthan, India in 1973 under the leadership Shri T. N. Mishra. He believed in the dictum of Dr. Sarvepalli Radhakrishnan, philosopher, teacher and former President of India, which conveys that education must make a child a good human being first and foremost, and then a worthy scholar.

Central Academy Organisation has a large chain of schools spread over 126 branches in India, including Jaipur, Udaipur, Jodhpur, Ajmer, Alwar, Bhilwara, Chittorgarh, Beawar, Kekri, Pali etc. in Rajasthan; and Lucknow, Allahabad, Basti, Mau, Barabanki, Gorakhpur, Deoria, Chauri Chauri, etc. in Uttar Pradesh.
Every year on the birth anniversary of Central Academy's late chairman Pandit T. N. Mishra, an inter-branch competition is held on the 14, 15 and 16 December known as the Fun Week. In this event, various schools come from different states in a specific Central Academy branch to participate in several competitions such as painting, essay writing, debate, chess, etc.

Notable alumni
Vishal Joshi, Plays for Saurashtra in Indian domestic cricket

See also
 List of schools in Udaipur
 List of schools in Rajasthan

References 
 Central Academy Schools in India
Central Academy School in Jodhpur
Central Academy  Ajmer
Central Academy Jaipur

Schools in Lucknow
Schools in Udaipur
Primary schools in India
High schools and secondary schools in Rajasthan
Educational institutions established in 1976
1976 establishments in Rajasthan